The Africa Theological Journal is a biannual peer-reviewed academic journal published by Tumaini University Makumira. It was established in 1968 and contains articles of theological interest relevant in Africa. The journal is abstracted and indexed in the ATLA Religion Database.

See also
List of theological journals

References

Christianity studies journals
Publications established in 1968
Biannual journals
English-language journals
Academic journals published by universities and colleges